The Canton of Croisilles is a former canton situated in the department of the Pas-de-Calais and in the Nord-Pas-de-Calais region of northern France. It was disbanded following the French canton reorganisation which came into effect in March 2015. It had a total of 12,194 inhabitants (2012).

Geography 
The canton is organized around Croisilles in the arrondissement of Arras. The altitude varies from 52m (Chérisy) to 154m (Bucquoy) for an average altitude of 92m.

The canton comprised 27 communes:

Ablainzevelle
Ayette
Boiry-Becquerelle
Boisleux-au-Mont
Boisleux-Saint-Marc
Boyelles
Bucquoy
Bullecourt
Chérisy
Courcelles-le-Comte
Croisilles
Douchy-lès-Ayette
Écoust-Saint-Mein
Ervillers
Fontaine-lès-Croisilles
Gomiécourt
Guémappe
Hamelincourt
Héninel
Hénin-sur-Cojeul
Mory
Moyenneville
Noreuil
Saint-Léger
Saint-Martin-sur-Cojeul
Vaulx-Vraucourt
Wancourt

Population

See also
Cantons of Pas-de-Calais 
Communes of Pas-de-Calais 
Arrondissements of the Pas-de-Calais department

References

Former cantons of Pas-de-Calais
2015 disestablishments in France
States and territories disestablished in 2015